is a passenger railway station located in the city of Anan, Tokushima Prefecture, Japan. It is operated by JR Shikoku and has the station number "M11".

Lines
Only local trains stop at the station.

Layout
The station consists of a side platform serving a single track. The present track was formerly track 2 of a two-track island platform configuration. The trackbed of track 1, on the other side of the platform is still visible. The station building is unstaffed and serves only as a waiting room. A paved path crosses the trackbed of the former track 1 and leads to a ramp, giving wheelchair access to the platform.

Adjacent stations

History
Awa-Nakashima Station was opened on 27 March 1936 by Japanese Government Railways (JGR) under the name Awa-Nakajima. On 15 October 1936, the reading of the station name was changed to Awa-Nakashima, with no change to the kanji characters used. On 1 April 1987, with the privatization of Japanese National Railways (JNR), the successor of JGR, JR Shikoku took over control of the Station.

Passenger statistics
In fiscal 2019, the station was used by an average of 270 passengers daily

Surrounding area
Anan City Hall Nakagawa Branch (formerly Nakagawa Town Hall)
Anan City Nagagawa Library
Nakajima Post Office
Saikou-ji Temple

See also
List of railway stations in Japan

References

External links

 JR Shikoku timetable

Railway stations in Tokushima Prefecture
Railway stations in Japan opened in 1936
Anan, Tokushima